The Judicial Conference of the United States, formerly known as the Conference of Senior Circuit Judges, was created by the United States Congress in 1922 with the principal objective of framing policy guidelines for administration of judicial courts in the United States.

History 
Responding to a backlog of cases in the federal courts, in 1922 Congress enacted a new form of court administration that advanced the institutionalization of an independent judiciary. The establishment of an annual Conference of Senior Circuit Judges, later to be known as the Judicial Conference of the United States, culminated more than a decade of public debate on the reform of judicial administration. The Conference of Senior Circuit Judges provided the first formal mechanism by which members of the federal judiciary might develop national administrative policies, reassign judges temporarily, and recommend legislation.

Chief Justice William Howard Taft, appointed to the Supreme Court in 1921, had led a public campaign for federal judicial reform since leaving the White House in 1913. Taft proposed the appointment of at-large judges, what he called a "flying squadron," that could be assigned temporarily to congested courts. In Taft's plan, a conference of judges would serve primarily to assess the caseload of the lower courts and assign the at-large judges to courts in need. Taft, supported by a group of federal judges and legal scholars, hoped that the establishment of a more efficient federal judiciary would deflect the efforts of Senator George W. Norris and others who advocated an end to life tenure on the federal bench and the restriction of the lower federal courts' jurisdiction.

By the time Taft became Chief Justice, the increased caseload resulting from World War I and the enforcement of Prohibition had contributed to broad support for reform of the federal judiciary. Assuming a role as leader of the judiciary as well as the Supreme Court, Taft joined with Attorney General Harry M. Daugherty and appeared before the Senate Judiciary Committee to urge legislation. A large majority in Congress agreed with the need for reform, but both the Senate and the House of Representatives insisted on revising Taft's proposals so that they conformed more closely to the traditions of the federal judiciary.

Congress established an annual conference of the Chief Justice of the United States (or the senior associate justice if the Chief is unable), and the senior circuit judge (now called the chief judge) from each judicial circuit and charged the conference with a general mandate to advise on the administrative needs of the federal courts. The act required the senior judge in each district to prepare an annual report of the business of the district's court. The conference would use these reports to prepare suggestions for the temporary transfer of judges, pending the approval of all courts involved. This expansion of the authority to transfer judges fell far short of Taft's concept of a permanent corps of at-large judges. Congress established 24 temporary judgeships, but adhered to the principle of fixed residency for district judges. Congress also declined to make the attorney general a member of the conference, although the act permitted the Chief Justice to request the attorney general to report on the business of the courts. Even without a formal relationship with Congress or the Department of Justice (which then administered the federal courts), the conference offered the judiciary a means of communicating its administrative needs.

The conference was renamed the Judicial Conference of the United States in 1948. In 1956, Congress provided for the inclusion of the chief judge of the Court of Claims. At that time, the judges of the Court of Customs and Patent Appeals (CCPA) declined to include a representative on the conference. The size of the conference nearly doubled following an act of 1957 that provided for the appellate and district judges in each circuit to elect a district judge to represent the circuit on the conference for a term of three years. In 1961 the chief judge of the CCPA began serving on the conference. The chief judges of these Court of Claims and the CCPA served on the conference until 1982 when their courts merged to become the United States Court of Appeals for the Federal Circuit. In 1990, Congress provided for the inclusion of the chief judge of the United States Court of International Trade. In 1996, Congress expanded the district judge term up to five years and allowed senior district judges to serve.

Present tasks 
Five standing Advisory Committees of the Judicial Conference have been established, and are charged, respectively, with drafting proposed amendments to the:
Federal Rules of Civil Procedure;
Federal Rules of Criminal Procedure;
Federal Rules of Bankruptcy Procedure;
Federal Rules of Appellate Procedure; and
Federal Rules of Evidence.

Members of the Advisory Committees include judges, representatives from the Department of Justice, law professors, and practicing attorneys. The Advisory Committees propose rules, subject them to public comment, and then submit them to the Standing Committee on Rules of Practice and Procedure, which in turn submits them to the Judicial Conference, which recommends them to the Supreme Court for approval.  Explanatory notes of the drafting Advisory Committee are published along with the final adopted rules, and are frequently used as an authority on the interpretation of the rules.

Other active policy areas concern the operation of CM/ECF, the Case Management/Electronic Case Files system, and PACER, the electronic public access service for United States federal court documents.

On occasion, the Conference has authorized investigations of federal judges accused of criminal malfeasance. Those deemed guilty have been referred to the House Judiciary Committee for impeachment. This has happened three times during the 21st century.

Administrative Office of the United States Courts 

The Administrative Office of the United States Courts (AO) is the administrative agency of the United States federal court system. The AO is the central support entity for the federal judicial branch. It provides a wide range of administrative, legal, financial, management, program, and information technology services to the federal courts. It was established in 1939.

The AO is directly supervised by the Judicial Conference, and implements and executes Judicial Conference policies, as well as applicable federal statutes and regulations. The AO facilitates communications within the judiciary and with Congress, the executive branch, and the public on behalf of the judiciary.

Judicial councils 
Judicial councils are panels of each federal judicial circuit that are charged with making "necessary and appropriate orders for the effective and expeditious administration of justice" within their circuits. Among their responsibilities is judicial discipline, the formulation of circuit policy, the implementation of policy directives received from the Judicial Conference, and the annual submission of a report to the Administrative Office on the number and nature of orders entered during the year that relate to judicial misconduct. Each judicial circuit consists of the chief judge of the circuit and an equal number of circuit judges and district judges of the circuit.

Lists of members

Current members

All members 
The following list of Judicial Conference service is organized by the circuits and courts represented. It was compiled largely from the Reports of the Proceedings of the Judicial Conference and is complete through the most recent meeting of the conference. The list contains the names of those judges who were members of the conference, but not those who may occasionally have attended in their absence. District Judges are identified by the district in which they served.

Supreme Court of the United States
William Howard Taft, 1922–1929
Charles Evans Hughes, 1929–1941
Harlan Fiske Stone, 1941–1945
Frederick Moore Vinson, 1946–1953
Hugo Lafayette Black, 1953
Earl Warren, 1954–1969
Warren E. Burger, 1969–1986
William Rehnquist, 1987–2005
John Paul Stevens, 2005
John Roberts, 2006–present

United States Court of Appeals for the First Circuit
George H. Bingham, 1922–1938
Scott Wilson, 1939
Calvert Magruder, 1940–1959
Peter Woodbury, 1959–1964
Bailey Aldrich, 1965–1972
Frank M. Coffin, 1972–1983
Levin H. Campbell, 1983–1990
Stephen G. Breyer, 1990–1994
Juan R. Torruella, 1994–2001
Michael Boudin, 2001–2008
Sandra Lynch, 2008–2015
Jeffrey R. Howard, 2015–2022
David J. Barron, 2022–present

First Circuit District Judges
George Clinton Sweeney (D. Mass.), 1958–1961
Francis Ford (D. Mass.), 1961–1967
Edward T. Gignoux (D. Me.), 1967–1973
Andrew Caffrey (D. Mass.), 1973–1979
Raymond J. Pettine (D.R.I.), 1979–1982
W. Arthur Garrity Jr. (D. Mass.), 1982–1985
Juan M. Perez-Gimenez (D.P.R.), 1985–1988
Frank H. Freedman (D. Mass.), 1988–1991
Francis J. Boyle (D.R.I.), 1991–1994
Joseph L. Tauro (D. Mass.), 1995–1997
Joseph A. DiClerico Jr. (D.N.H.), 1998–2000
D. Brock Hornby (D. Me.), 2000–2003
Hector M. Laffitte (D.P.R.), 2003–2006
Ernest C. Torres (D.R.I.), 2007–2009
Mary M. Lisi (D.R.I.), 2009
Mark L. Wolf (D. Mass.), 2009–2012
Paul Barbadoro (D.N.H.), 2012–2017
Nancy Torresen (D. Me.), 2017–2021
Gustavo Gelpí (D.P.R.), 2021
Aida Delgado-Colon (D.P.R.), 2021–present

United States Court of Appeals for the Second Circuit
Henry Wade Rogers, 1922–1925
Charles Merrill Hough, 1926
Martin T. Manton, 1926–1938
Learned Hand, 1939–1951
Thomas W. Swan, 1951–1953
Harrie B. Chase, 1953–1954
Charles E. Clark, 1954–1959
J. Edward Lumbard, 1960–1971
Henry J. Friendly, 1971–1973
Irving R. Kaufman, 1973–1980
Wilfred Feinberg, 1980–1988
James L. Oakes, 1989–1992
Thomas J. Meskill, 1992–1993
Jon O. Newman, 1993–1997
Ralph K. Winter Jr., 1997–2000
John M. Walker Jr., 2000–2006
Dennis G. Jacobs, 2006–2013
Robert A. Katzmann, 2013–2020
Debra Ann Livingston, 2020–present

Second Circuit District Judges
Edward Jordan Dimock (S.D.N.Y.), 1958–1959
Sylvester J. Ryan (S.D.N.Y.), 1959–1968
Sidney Sugarman (S.D.N.Y.), 1968–1971
David N. Edelstein (S.D.N.Y.), 1971–1974
Jacob Mishler (E.D.N.Y.), 1974–1977
T. Emmet Clarie (D. Conn.), 1977–1980
Lloyd F. MacMahon (S.D.N.Y.), 1980–1982
Constance B. Motley (S.D.N.Y.), 1982–1983
Jack B. Weinstein (E.D.N.Y.), 1983–1986
John T. Curtin (W.D.N.Y.), 1986–1989
Charles L. Brieant (S.D.N.Y.), 1989–1995
Peter Dorsey (D. Conn.), 1996–1998
Charles P. Sifton (E.D.N.Y)., 1998–2001
Frederick Scullin (N.D.N.Y.), 2001–2004
Michael B. Mukasey (S.D.N.Y.), 2005–2006
Kimba M. Wood (S.D.N.Y.), 2006–2007
William K. Sessions III (D. Vt.), 2007–2010
Raymond J. Dearie (E.D.N.Y.), 2010–2011
Carol Amon (E.D.N.Y.), 2011–2015
William M. Skretny (W.D.N.Y.), 2015–2016
Colleen McMahon (S.D.N.Y.), 2016–2019
Stefan R. Underhill (D. Conn.), 2019–2022
Margo Kitsy Brodie (E.D.N.Y.), 2022–present

United States Court of Appeals for the Third Circuit
Joseph Buffington, 1922–1937
John Warren Davis, 1938
John Biggs Jr., 1939–1965
Harry E. Kalodner, 1966
Austin Staley, 1966–1967
William H. Hastie, 1968–1971
Collins J. Seitz, 1971–1984
Ruggero J. Aldisert, 1984–1986
John J. Gibbons, 1987–1989
A. Leon Higginbotham, 1990
Dolores Sloviter, 1991–1997
Edward R. Becker, 1998–2003
Anthony J. Scirica, 2003–2010
Theodore A. McKee, 2010–2016
D. Brooks Smith, 2016–2021
Michael Chagares, 2021–present

Third Circuit District Judges
Phillip Forman (D.N.J.), 1957–1959
James Cullen Ganey (E.D. Pa.), 1959–1961
Thomas M. Madden (D.N.J.), 1961–1966
Thomas James Clary (E.D. Pa.), 1966–1968
Wallace S. Gourley (W.D. Pa.), 1968–1970
Caleb M. Wright (D. Del.), 1970–1972
Michael Henry Sheridan (M.D. Pa.), 1972–1975
Lawrence A. Whipple (D.N.J.), 1975–1978
Alfred Leopold Luongo (E.D. Pa.), 1978–1981
Gerald J. Weber (W.D. Pa.), 1981–1984
Walter K. Stapleton (D. Del.), 1984–1985
Murray M. Schwartz (D. Del.), 1985–1987
William J. Nealon (M.D. Pa.), 1987–1990
John F. Gerry (D.N.J.), 1990–1994
Edward N. Cahn (E.D. Pa.), 1994–1997
Donald E. Ziegler (W.D. Pa.), 1998–2000
Sue L. Robinson (D. Del.), 2000–2003
Thomas I. Vanaskie (M.D. Pa.), 2003–2005
Garrett E. Brown Jr. (D.N.J.), 2005–2008
Harvey Bartle III (E.D. Pa.), 2008–2011
Gary L. Lancaster (W.D. Pa.), 2011–2013
Joy Flowers Conti (W.D. Pa.), 2013–2015
Leonard P. Stark (D. Del.), 2015–2017
Christopher C. Conner (M.D. Pa.), 2017–2021
Freda L. Wolfson, (D.N.J.), 2021–2023
Renée Marie Bumb, (D.N.J.), 2023–present

United States Court of Appeals for the Fourth Circuit
Charles Albert Woods, 1922–1924
Edmund Waddill Jr., 1925–1930
John Johnston Parker, 1931–1957
Simon E. Sobeloff, 1958–1964
Clement F. Haynsworth, 1964–1981
Harrison L. Winter, 1981–1989
Sam J. Ervin III, 1989–1995
J. Harvie Wilkinson III, 1996–2003
William W. Wilkins, 2003–2007
Karen J. Williams, 2007–2009
William B. Traxler Jr., 2009–2016
Roger Gregory, 2016–present

Fourth Circuit District Judges
Roszel C. Thomsen (D. Md.), 1958–1964
Walter E. Hoffman (E.D. Va.), 1964–1970
Oren R. Lewis (E.D. Va.), 1970–1973
Charles E. Simons (D.S.C.), 1973–1979
Robert R. Merhige (E.D. Va.), 1980–1985
Frank Kaufman (D. Md.), 1985–1991
W. Earl Britt (E.D.N.C.), 1991–1997
Charles H. Haden II (S.D. W. Va.), 1998–2002
David C. Norton (D.S.C.), 2003–2007
James P. Jones (W.D. Va.), 2007–2011
Deborah K. Chasanow (D. Md.), 2011–2015
Robert J. Conrad, (W.D.N.C.), 2016–2021
John P. Bailey (N.D. W. Va.) 2021–present

United States Court of Appeals for the Fifth Circuit
Richard Wilde Walker Jr., 1922–1929
Nathan Philemon Bryan, 1930–1934
Rufus Edward Foster, 1935–1941
Samuel Hale Sibley, 1942–1947
Joseph Chappell Hutcheson Jr., 1948–1959
Richard Taylor Rives, 1959–1960
Elbert Parr Tuttle, 1961–1967
John R. Brown, 1967–1979
James P. Coleman, 1980
John Cooper Godbold, 1981
Charles Clark, 1982–1991
Henry A. Politz, 1992–1998
Carolyn Dineen King, 1999–2006
Edith Hollan Jones, 2006–2012
Carl E. Stewart, 2012–2019
Priscilla Richman, 2019–present

 Fifth Circuit District Judges
Seybourn Harris Lynne (N.D. Ala.), 1958–1959
Ben Clarkson Connally (S.D. Tex.), 1959–1962
John Milton Bryan Simpson (M.D. Fla.), 1962–1965
Herbert William Christenberry (E.D. La.), 1965–1968
G. Harrold Carswell (N.D. Fla.), 1968–1969
Joe Ewing Estes (N.D. Tex.), 1969–1971
E. Gordon West (E.D. & M.D. La.), 1971–1974
Alexander Lawrence (S.D. Ga.), 1974–1977
William C. Keady (N.D. Miss.), 1977–1980
John V. Singleton (S.D. Tex.), 1980–1983
Adrian G. Duplantier (E.D. La.), 1983–1986
Lyonel Thomas Senter Jr. (N.D. Miss.), 1986–1989
Barefoot Sanders (N.D. Tex.), 1989–1992
Morey L. Sear (E.D. La.), 1992–1995
William H. Barbour Jr. (S.D. Miss.), 1996–1998
Hayden Wilson Head Jr. (S.D. Tex.), 1999–2001
Martin L. C. Feldman (E.D. La.), 2001–2004
Glen H. Davidson (N.D. Miss.), 2005–2007
Sim Lake III (S.D. Tex.), 2007–2010
Sarah S. Vance (E.D. La.), 2010–2015
Louis Guirola Jr. (S.D. Miss.), 2015–2016
Lee H. Rosenthal (S.D. Tex.), 2016–2019
S. Maurice Hicks Jr. (W.D. La.), 2019–2022
Debra M. Brown (N.D. Miss.), 2022–present

United States Court of Appeals for the Sixth Circuit
Loyal Edwin Knappen, 1922–1923
Arthur C. Denison, 1924–1931
Charles H. Moorman, 1932–1937
Xenophon Hicks, 1938–1951
Charles Casper Simons, 1952–1958
Florence E. Allen, 1958
John Donelson Martin, Sr., 1959
Thomas Francis McAllister, 1959–1960
Shackelford Miller Jr., 1961–1962
Lester LeFevre Cecil, 1962–1963
Paul C. Weick, 1964–1969
Harry P. Phillips, 1969–1978
George Clifton Edwards Jr., 1979–1983
Pierce Lively, 1984–1988
Albert J. Engel, 1988–1989
Gilbert S. Merritt, 1990–1996
Boyce F. Martin Jr., 1997–2003
Danny J. Boggs, 2003–2009
Alice M. Batchelder, 2009–2014
R. Guy Cole Jr., 2014–2021
Jeffrey Sutton, 2021–present

Sixth Circuit District Judges
Paul J. Jones (N.D. Ohio), 1958–1960
Marion Speed Boyd (W.D. Tenn.), 1960–1963
Ralph McKenzie Freeman (E.D. Mich.), 1963–1966
Mac Swinford (E.D. & W.D. Ky.), 1966–1969
Carl A. Weinman (S.D. Ohio), 1969–1972
Robert Love Taylor (judge) (E.D. Tenn.), 1972–1975
Damon J. Keith (E.D. Mich.), 1975–1978
Charles M. Allen (W.D. Ky.), 1978–1981
Frank J. Battisti (N.D. Ohio), 1981–1984
Robert Malcolm McRae Jr. (W.D. Tenn.), 1984–1987
Philip Pratt (E.D. Mich.), 1987–1989
James P. Churchill (E.D. Mich.), 1989–1990
Eugene Siler (E.D. & W.D. Ky.), 1990–1991
Edward Johnstone (W.D. Ky.), 1991–1993
Thomas Lambros (N.D. Ohio), 1993–1994
John D. Holschuh (S.D. Ohio), 1995
S. Arthur Spiegel (S.D. Ohio), 1995–1996
Thomas A. Wiseman Jr. (M.D. Tenn.), 1997–2001
Lawrence P. Zatkoff (E.D. Mich.), 2001–2004
William Bertelsman (E.D. Ky.), 2005–2006
Charles R. Simpson III (W.D. Ky.), 2006–2007
Thomas M. Rose (S.D. Ohio), 2007–2009
Solomon Oliver Jr. (N.D. Ohio), 2009–2010
Thomas A. Varlan (E.D. Tenn.), 2010–2015
Paul Lewis Maloney (W.D. Mich.), 2015–2016
Joseph Martin Hood (E.D. Ky.), 2016–2019
Thomas B. Russell (W.D. Ky.), 2019
Michael H. Watson (S.D. Ohio), 2019–2021
Sara Elizabeth Lioi (N.D. Ohio), 2021–2022
S. Thomas Anderson (W.D. Tenn.), 2022–presentUnited States Court of Appeals for the Seventh Circuit
Francis E. Baker, 1922–1923
Samuel Alschuler, 1924–1934
Evan A. Evans, 1935–1947
William Morris Sparks, 1948
James Earl Major, 1949–1954
Francis Ryan Duffy, 1954–1959
John S. Hastings, 1959–1968
Latham Castle, 1968–1969
Luther M. Swygert, 1970–1974
Thomas E. Fairchild, 1975–1981
Walter J. Cummings, 1981–1986
William J. Bauer, 1987–1993
Richard A. Posner, 1994–2000
Joel M. Flaum, 2000–2006
Frank H. Easterbrook, 2006–2015
Diane Pamela Wood, 2015–2020
Diane S. Sykes, 2020–present

Seventh Circuit District Judges
William Joseph Campbell (N.D. Ill.), 1958–1961
Luther M. Swygert (N.D. Ind.), 1961
William E. Steckler (S.D. Ind.), 1962–1964
Kenneth P. Grubb (E.D. Wis), 1964–1965
Edwin A. Robson (N.D. Ill.), 1966–1969
Robert A. Grant (N.D. Ind.), 1969–1972
James Edward Doyle (W.D. Wis.), 1972–1975
James B. Parsons (N.D. Ill.), 1975–1978
S. Hugh Dillin (S.D. Ind.), 1979–1982
John W. Reynolds (E.D. Wis.), 1982–1985
Frank J. McGarr (N.D. Ill.), 1985–1987
Sarah Evans Barker (S.D. Ind.), 1988–1991
Barbara Crabb (W.D. Wis.), 1991–1994
Michael M. Mihm (C.D. Ill.), 1995–1997
Robert Lowell Miller Jr. (N.D. Ind.), 1998–2000
Marvin Aspen (N.D. Ill.), 2000–2003
J.P. Stadtmueller (E.D. Wis.), 2003–2006
Wayne Andersen (N.D. Ill.), 2006–2009
Richard L. Young (S.D. Ind.), 2009–2012
Rubén Castillo (N.D. Ill.), 2012–2015
Michael Joseph Reagan (S.D. Ill.), 2015–2018
Rebecca R. Pallmeyer (N.D. Ill.), 2019–2021
Jon DeGuilio (N.D. Ind.), 2021–present

United States Court of Appeals for the Eighth Circuit
Walter Henry Sanborn, 1922–1926
Kimbrough Stone, 1927–1947
Archibald K. Gardner, 1947–1959
Harvey M. Johnsen, 1959–1965
Charles Joseph Vogel, 1965–1967
Martin D. Van Oosterhout, 1968–1970
Marion C. Matthes, 1970–1973
Pat Mehaffy, 1973–1974
Floyd R. Gibson, 1974–1979
Donald P. Lay, 1980–1991
Richard Arnold, 1992–1998
Pasco M. Bowman II, 1998–1999
Roger L. Wollman, 1999–2002
David R. Hansen, 2002–2003
James B. Loken, 2003–2010
William J. Riley, 2010–2017
Lavenski Smith, 2017–present

Eighth Circuit District Judges
Gunnar Hans Nordbye (D. Minn.), 1958–1962
John Elvis Miller (W.D. Ark.), 1962–1963
Richard M. Duncan (E.D. & W.D. Mo.), 1963–1965
Roy W. Harper (E.D. & W.D. Mo.), 1965–1971
Oren Harris (E.D. & W.D. Ark.), 1971–1974
James H. Meredith (E.D. Mo.), 1974–1979
Albert G. Schatz (D. Neb.), 1979–1985
John F. Nangle (E.D. Mo.), 1985–1990
Donald E. O'Brien (N.D. & S.D. Iowa), 1991–1997
James M. Rosenbaum (D. Minn.), 1998–2005
Lawrence L. Piersol (D.S.D.), 2006–2009
Rodney W. Sippel (E.D. Mo.), 2009–2015
Karen E. Schreier (D.S.D.), 2015–2016
Linda R. Reade  (N.D. Iowa), 2016–2021
John R. Tunheim (D. Minn.), 2021–present

United States Court of Appeals for the Ninth Circuit
William Ball Gilbert, 1922–1930
Curtis Dwight Wilbur, 1931–1944
Francis Arthur Garrecht, 1945–1947
William Denman, 1948–1957
Albert Lee Stephens, 1957–1958
Walter Lyndon Pope, 1959
Richard H. Chambers, 1959–1976
James R. Browning, 1976–1988
Alfred T. Goodwin, 1988–1990
J. Clifford Wallace, 1991–1995
Procter Ralph Hug Jr., 1996–2000
Mary M. Schroeder, 2001–2007
Alex Kozinski, 2007–2014
Sidney R. Thomas, 2014–2021
Mary H. Murguia, 2021–present

Ninth Circuit District Judges
William C. Mathes (S.D. Cal.), 1958–1960
William J. Lindberg (E.D. & W.D. Wash.), 1960–1963
Gus J. Solomon (D. Ore.), 1963–1965
Albert Wollenberg (N.D. Cal.), 1966–1969
Fred M. Taylor (D. Idaho), 1969–1972
Jesse W. Curtis (C.D. Cal.), 1972–1975
Thomas J. MacBride (E.D. Cal.), 1975–1978
Morell Sharp (W.D. Wash.), 1978–1980
Raymond Clyne McNichols (D. Idaho), 1980–1981
Manuel L. Real (C.D. Cal.), 1981–1984
Robert J. McNichols (E.D. Wash.), 1984–1987
Robert F. Peckham (N.D. Cal.), 1987–1990
William D. Browning (D. Ariz.), 1990–1993
William Matthew Byrne Jr. (C.D. Cal.), 1993–1996
Lloyd D. George (D. Nev.), 1997–1999
Judith N. Keep (S.D. Cal.), 1999–2003
David Alan Ezra (D. Haw.), 2003–2005
Charles R. Breyer (N.D. Cal.), 2006–2010
Robert S. Lasnik (W.D. Wash.), 2010–2015
Claudia Ann Wilken (N.D. Cal.), 2015–2019
Rosanna M. Peterson (E.D. Wash), 2019–2021
Leslie E. Kobayashi (D. Haw), 2021–present

United States Court of Appeals for the Tenth Circuit
Robert E. Lewis, 1929–1940
Orie Leon Phillips, 1940–1955
Sam Gilbert Bratton, 1956–1959
Alfred P. Murrah, 1959–1970
David T. Lewis, 1970–1977
Oliver Seth, 1978–1984
William Judson Holloway Jr., 1984–1991
Monroe McKay, 1991–1993
Stephanie K. Seymour, 1994–2000
Deanell R. Tacha, 2001–2007
Robert H. Henry, 2008–2010
Mary Beck Briscoe, 2010–2015
Timothy Tymkovich, 2015–2022
Jerome Holmes, 2022–present

Tenth Circuit District Judges
Eugene Rice (E.D. Okla.), 1958
Royce H. Savage (N.D. Okla.), 1958–1961
Ewing Thomas Kerr (D. Wyo.), 1962–1964
Alfred A. Arraj (D. Colo.), 1964–1967
Arthur Jehu Stanley Jr. (D. Kan.), 1967–1970
Olin Hatfield Chilson (D. Colo.), 1970–1973
Frederick A. Daugherty (E.D., N.D., & W.D. Okla.), 1973–1976
Wesley E. Brown (D. Kan.), 1976–1979
Howard C. Bratton (D.N.M.), 1979–1982
Luther B. Eubanks (W.D. Okla.), 1982–1985
Sherman G. Finesilver (D. Colo.), 1985–1988
Earl E. O'Connor (D. Kan.), 1988–1991
Richard P. Matsch (D. Colo.), 1991–1994
Clarence A. Brimmer (D. Wyo.), 1994–1997
Ralph G. Thompson (W.D. Okla.), 1998–2000
Frank Howell Seay (E.D. Okla.), 2000–2003
David L. Russell (W.D. Okla.), 2003–2006
Alan B. Johnson (D. Wyo.), 2006–2009
Robin J. Cauthron (W.D. Okla.), 2009–2012
Dee Benson (D. Utah), 2012–2015
Martha Vázquez (D.N.M.), 2015–2019
Claire Eagan (N.D. Okla.), 2019–2022
William Paul Johnson (D.N.M.), 2022–present

United States Court of Appeals for the Eleventh Circuit
John C. Godbold, 1982–1986
Paul H. Roney, 1986–1989
Gerald B. Tjoflat, 1990–1996
Joseph W. Hatchett, 1997–1999
R. Lanier Anderson III, 1999–2002
J. L. Edmondson, 2002–2009
Joel F. Dubina, 2009–2013
Ed Carnes, 2013–2020
William H. Pryor Jr., 2020–present

Eleventh Circuit District Judges
William Clark O'Kelley (N.D. Ga.), 1982–1984
James Lawrence King (S.D. Fla.), 1984–1987
Sam C. Pointer (N.D. Ala.), 1987–1990
Anthony Alaimo (S.D. Ga.), 1990–1993
William Terrell Hodges (M.D. Fla.), 1994–1999
Charles Randolph Butler Jr. (S.D. Ala.), 1999–2003
J. Owen Forrester (N.D. Ga.), 2003–2005
Robert L. Hinkle (N.D. Fla.), 2006–2007
Myron H. Thompson (M.D. Ala.), 2007–2011
W. Louis Sands (M.D. Ga.), 2011–2014
Federico A. Moreno (S.D. Fla.), 2015–2019
L. Scott Coogler (N.D. Ala.), 2019–present

United States Court of Appeals for the District of Columbia Circuit
Duncan Lawrence Groner, 1938–1947
Harold Montelle Stephens, 1948–1955
Henry White Edgerton, 1955–1958
E. Barrett Prettyman, 1959–1960
Wilbur Kingsbury Miller, 1961–1962
David L. Bazelon, 1963–1977
J. Skelly Wright, 1978–1980
Carl McGowan, 1981
Spottswood W. Robinson III, 1981–1986
Patricia M. Wald, 1986–1990
Abner Mikva, 1991–1994
Harry T. Edwards, 1994–2001
Douglas H. Ginsburg, 2001–2008
David B. Sentelle, 2008–2013
Merrick B. Garland, 2013–2020
Sri Srinivasan, 2020–present

D.C. Circuit District Judges
Bolitha Laws (D.D.C.), 1958
David Andrew Pine (D.D.C.), 1959–1961
Matthew F. McGuire (D.D.C.), 1961–1967
Edward M. Curran (D.D.C.), 1968–1971
John J. Sirica (D.D.C.), 1971–1974
George L. Hart (D.D.C.), 1974–1975
William Blakely Jones (D.D.C.), 1975–1977
William B. Bryant (D.D.C.), 1977–1981
John Lewis Smith (D.D.C.), 1981–1982
Aubrey E. Robinson Jr. (D.D.C.), 1982–1992
John Garrett Penn (D.D.C.), 1992–1997
Norma Holloway Johnson (D.D.C.), 1997–2001
Thomas F. Hogan (D.D.C.), 2001–2008
Royce C. Lamberth (D.D.C.), 2008–2013
Richard W. Roberts (D.D.C.), 2013–2016
Beryl A. Howell (D.D.C.), 2016–present

United States Court of Appeals for the Federal Circuit
Howard T. Markey, 1983–1990
Helen W. Nies, 1990–1994
Glenn L. Archer Jr., 1994–1997
Haldane Robert Mayer, 1998–2004
Paul R. Michel, 2004–2010
Randall R. Rader, 2010–2014
Sharon Prost, 2014–2021
Kimberly A. Moore, 2021–present

United States Court of Federal Claims
(prior to merger of the appellate division into the Federal Circuit)
Marvin Jones, 1956–1964
Wilson Cowen, 1964–1976
Oscar H. Davis, 1977–1978
Daniel M. Friedman, 1978–1982

United States Court of Customs and Patent Appeals
(prior to merger into the Federal Circuit)
Eugene Worley, 1961–1972
Howard T. Markey, 1972–1982

United States Court of International Trade
Edward D. Re, 1990–1991
Gregory Carman, 1991
Dominick L. DiCarlo, 1992–1996
Gregory W. Carman, 1997–2003
Jane A. Restani, 2003–2010
Donald C. Pogue, 2010–2014
Timothy C. Stanceu, 2014–2021
Mark A. Barnett, 2021–present

See also 
 Judicial Council of California

References

External links 
 
 Judicial Conference of the United States in the Federal Register

1922 in law
1922 establishments in the United States
Agencies of the United States government
Federal judiciary of the United States
Court administration